Nogometni klub Kamnik, commonly referred to as NK Kamnik or simply Kamnik, is a Slovenian football club from Kamnik. The club was founded in 1920.

Honours
Ljubljana Regional League (fourth tier)
 Winners: 2007–08

MNZ Ljubljana Cup
 Winners: 2011–12

References

External links
Official website 

Association football clubs established in 1920
Football clubs in Slovenia
1920 establishments in Slovenia